Irishtown is a locality and small rural community in the local government area of Circular Head, in the North West region of Tasmania. The 2016 census determined a population of 301 for the state suburb of Irishtown.

History
The original name of the locality may have been “Upper Duck River”. The current name was confirmed in 1972. Note that while Duck River does not flow through the locality several of its tributaries do.

Road infrastructure
The B22 route (Irishtown Road) runs from the Bass Highway through the locality, providing access to areas further south.

References

Localities of Circular Head Council
Towns in Tasmania